Lincoln Seligman (born 1950) is a British artist, best known for his large-scale sculptures and murals displayed at modern landmark buildings worldwide.

Lincoln was born the eldest son of Madron Seligman, (a hereditary industrialist and a pro-European Member of the European Parliament for West Sussex from 1979 to 1984) and his wife, Nancy-Joan. He was educated at Harrow School, winning an exhibition to Balliol College, Oxford to study jurisprudence. He was called to the Bar in 1973 and became a professional painter and sculptor in 1980.

His godfather was Edward Heath, a close friend of his father.

Prominent works include Intervention, above the entrance of the Treatment Centre of the Chelsea and Westminster Hospital in London, and many large scale sculptures displayed at Hong Kong Harbor and on the Kowloon peninsula.

Seligman is a member of the Royal British Society of Sculptors.
His major  works include sculpture commissions for Schroders, The Prudential,  BAA, Battersea Reach, Chelsea Harbour,Broadgate, Swiss Bank. Glaxo Smith Kline 
Outside UK: HQ of Cathay Pacific, Hong Kong. MTR Kowloon. SWIRES, Sing Pao Building. East Hotel, Westin Taipei, Royal Caribbean, Phoenix City Beijing for Chinese government.
One man show of paintings at Royal Academy London 2007, sponsored by Standard Chartered Bank.  Paintings in collections of Duke of Devonshire, Duke of Roxburghe, Ian Paisley, Royal Palace Riyadh, Chanel, Tiffany, Laurent Perrier, Paul Simon, Flemings, Standard Chartered Bank.
Designed " Bright Young Things "  ballet for New English Ballet Theatre with  Dutch choreographer  Ernst Meisner, premiere July 2012 Peacock Theatre  Sadlers Wells London. 
Designs new ballet, 'Kreutzer Sonata", for NEBT gala at Royal Opera House, Covent Garden  October 2013.

He was one of the first on the scene at the Dibbles Bridge coach crash on 27 May 1975, when a coach crashed into the garden of the house where he was staying near Grassington in North Yorkshire.

Sources

External links
 Lincoln Seligman Exhibition seeingisbelieving.org.uk accessed 27 May 2019
 Quantum Contemporary Art Lincoln Seligman quantumart.co.uk accessed 27 May 2019
 Glaxo SmithKline Art for Offices (Mobile and paintings by Lincoln Seligman) (Archived copy accessed 27 May 2019)
 Own web page lincolnseligman.com accessed 27 May 2019

In-line references

English sculptors
English male sculptors
English muralists
1950 births
Living people
English people of German-Jewish descent
People educated at Harrow School
Alumni of Balliol College, Oxford
English barristers